Abdurrahman Mahmoud Aidiid (Soltelco) is a Somalilander politician. He is a former Mayor of Hargeisa, the largest city and capital of Somaliland from 2013 to 2021,. He belongs to the Sa'ad Musa sub-division of the Habr Awal Isaaq clan.

Career
Aidiid is a member of the Peace, Unity, and Development Party (Kulmiye), the ruling political party in Somaliland. After the death of Hargeisa Mayor Yusuf Warsame Saeed, Aidiid was elected as replacement leader on April 14, 2013 by a quorum of 24 municipal councilors. He is the youngest official ever to be appointed to the position. He was succeeded by Abdikarim Ahmed Mooge as the mayor of Hargeisa after the 2021 Somaliland municipal elections, gaining the most votes out of all candidates in Hargeisa.

References

Living people
Ethnic Somali people
Mayors of Hargeisa
Peace, Unity, and Development Party politicians
Year of birth missing (living people)
People from Hargeisa